Golden Fleece is a locality in the North Burnett Region, Queensland, Australia.

Geography 
The western boundary of the locality follows the ridge line of the Woowoonga Range. Golden Fleece Creek rises in the south of the locality and Boundary Creek rises in the west of the locality. From their confluence in the north-east of the locality the creek becomes known as Sandy Creek which flows north into Eureka.

The Isis Highway passes through the locality from north (Eureka) to north-west (Dallarnil).

The south-east of the locality is within the Wongi National Park and the Wongi State Forest. Apart from those, the principal land use is grazing.

Education 
There are no schools in Golden Fleece. The nearest primary schools are in Dallarnil and Biggenden. The nearest secondary schools are in Biggenden (to Year 10) and Childers (to Year 12).

References 

North Burnett Region
Localities in Queensland